"Hillbilly Rock" is a song written by Paul Kennerley, and recorded by American country music artist Marty Stuart. It was released in March 1990 as the third single and title track from the album Hillbilly Rock. The song reached No. 8 on the Billboard Hot Country Singles & Tracks chart.

Background
According to an interview with Marty Stuart, songwriter Paul Kennerley had initially composed "Hillbilly Rock" for the Judds to potentially record. Conversely, Stuart had signed a new deal with MCA Records in the late 1980s following his brief tenure at Columbia Records. Music executive Tony Brown, who had signed Stuart to MCA, subsequently paired him with Kennerley to write songs together, during which Kennerley presented "Hillbilly Rock" to Stuart and convinced him to record the song himself.

Music video
The music video was directed by Joanne Gardner and premiered in early 1990.

Chart performance

Year-end charts

References

1990 singles
Marty Stuart songs
Songs written by Paul Kennerley
Song recordings produced by Tony Brown (record producer)
MCA Records singles
1989 songs